Hygrocybe prieta is a mushroom of the waxcap genus Hygrocybe. Described as new to science in 1990, it is found in Puerto Rico, where it grows on clay banks under boulders and elevated tree roots.

See also
List of Hygrocybe species

References

External links

Fungi of the Caribbean
prieta
Fungi described in 1990